Reichen Lehmkuhl, (born Richard Allen Lehmkuhl; December 26, 1973) is an American lawyer, businessman, reality show winner, former model, and former occasional actor. A former United States Air Force officer with the rank of captain, he is best known for winning season four of the reality game show The Amazing Race with his then-partner Chip Arndt, and for his much publicized 2006 relationship with pop singer Lance Bass.

Early life
After Lehmkuhl's parents, a policeman and a nurse, divorced when he was five, his family moved to Norton, Massachusetts, and his mother remarried. Sometime after 2002, he changed his first name legally from Richard to Reichen.

Lehmkuhl graduated from the United States Air Force Academy. He has since advocated for gay rights in the military as a spokesperson for Servicemembers Legal Defense Network.

The Amazing Race

Lehmkuhl was working simultaneously as a physics teacher at Crossroads School for the Arts and Sciences, flight instructor, and model in Los Angeles when he was approached by a casting director for The Amazing Race. Lehmkuhl and Chip Arndt were a couple during the competition but have since split. Lehmkuhl moved to Dallas, Texas briefly after his win on The Amazing Race, but before all episodes had been broadcast. Reichen's spending habits at that time caused speculation that he had won The Amazing Race — and that he and Arndt had broken up. During the show, the couple was typically described as "Married" in the subtitles that are used to illustrate the relationship between team members (other teams being, for example, "Best Friends" or "Father-Daughter").

In January 2003, Lehmkuhl competed on the fourth season of the CBS adventure reality show The Amazing Race with his "husband" Chip Arndt. The two reached the final leg of the race and won the season.

The Amazing Race 4 finishes

A  indicates that Reichen and Chip won the Fast Forward.

Roadblocks performed by Lehmkuhl are bolded 

Notes

After The Amazing Race
Lehmkuhl had a cameo in an episode of Frasier in September 2003 as "Impossibly Handsome Man" followed by a cameo on "The Drew Carey Show."

Lehmkuhl hosted The Reichen Show on Q Television Network until Q Television ceased operations in May 2006. His autobiography Here's What We'll Say, about his time in the Air Force under the military's official "Don't ask, don't tell" policy, was released by Carroll and Graf on October 28, 2006. The New York Post reported in November 2010 that the book had been adapted into a screenplay. 
He published a beefcake calendar for several years and has appeared on sitcoms, soap operas, and other reality television shows.

On May 1, 2007, the LGBT-interest television network here! announced that Lehmkuhl had joined the cast for the third season of its original gothic soap opera, Dante's Cove. He plays the role of Trevor, originally described as "a business school graduate who comes to Dante's Cove looking to find himself."

Lehmkuhl starred in My Big Gay Italian Wedding, an off-Broadway production from its opening May 5, 2010, in New York City to July 24, 2010. A percentage of ticket sales promoted legalization of same-sex marriages in the US through Broadway Impact.

LGBT-interest network Logo announced on June 3, 2010, that Lehmkuhl and boyfriend, model Rodiney Santiago had joined the cast of Logo's reality series, The A-List: New York. The series was cancelled after two seasons. Since the airing, Lehmkuhl and Santiago are no longer a couple.

He released an album, Up to the Sky, in 2010. He also founded a company LeaseLock.com.

Personal life
In July 2006, former NSYNC band member Lance Bass told People that he is gay and in a "very stable relationship" with Lehmkuhl. The couple broke up in January 2007. Bass said they remained "good friends".

References

External links

1973 births
Living people
American people of German descent
The Amazing Race (American TV series) contestants
American jewelry designers
American LGBT military personnel
American memoirists
American television talk show hosts
American gay actors
American LGBT broadcasters
Gay memoirists
Gay models
American gay writers
LGBT people from Ohio
Writers from Cincinnati
Reality show winners
United States Air Force Academy alumni
Gay military personnel
Participants in American reality television series